The ash-browed spinetail (Cranioleuca curtata) is a species of bird in the family Furnariidae. It is found in Bolivia, Colombia, Ecuador, and Peru. Its natural habitat is subtropical or tropical moist montane forest.

References

ash-browed spinetail
Birds of the Northern Andes
ash-browed spinetail
ash-browed spinetail
Taxonomy articles created by Polbot